Mentz is a former form of Mainz in Germany. It may also refer to:

Places
 Mentz, New York
 Mentz, Texas

People
 August Mentz (1867-1944), Danish botanist
 Hendrik Mentz (1877-1938), South African politician
 Henno Mentz (born 1979), South African rugby player
 Henry Mentz (1920-2005), Federal District Judge, American jurist and scholar
 Johann von Mentz (died 1583), Governor of Ösel (1576-1584)
 MJ Mentz (born 19?), South African rugby player (brother of Henno)

See also
 Menz, a former province of Ethiopia
 Mintz
 Mentzer
 Mentzen (disambiguation)